Ulzzang, also spelled as eoljjang, is a popular South Korean term literally meaning "best face" or "good-looking". A person desiring ulzzang status would gain popularity on the internet through entering contests where their photos are judged and chosen by voters. The trend is unisex and is practised by both males and females.

The popularity and influence of Korean popular culture throughout Asia has led to ulzzangs becoming a trend in Asian countries such as China, Vietnam, Indonesia, Japan, Malaysia, the Philippines, Singapore, and certain parts of South Asia.

See also
 Aegyo
 Bishoujo
 Bishounen
 Kkonminam
 Moe

References

South Korean popular culture
South Korean youth culture
Beauty
Effeminacy
Korean words and phrases